Canada–Malaysia relations refers to bilateral foreign relations between the two countries, Canada and Malaysia. Canada has a high commission in Kuala Lumpur, and Malaysia has a high commission in Ottawa. Both countries are full members of the Commonwealth of Nations. Canada has a long history of close and friendly bilateral relations with Malaysia and was the first country to recognise Malaysia's independence.

Science and technologies 
Canada and Malaysia have strengthening ties in sectors such as aerospace, green technology, agriculture, transport, oil and gas.

Notably, Petronas (the Malaysian state-owned oil and gas company) has a 25% equity ownership in LNG Canada, which at CAD 40 billion, is the largest private sector investment in Canadian history. Canada is Petronas' second largest resource holder, after Malaysia.

Trade 
Canada's trade relationship with Malaysia includes commerce across several sectors. Malaysia is also one of the members of the Trans-Pacific Strategic Economic Partnership which Canada joined in 2012. In 2018, Canada seeking to enhanced the trade relations with the Malaysian state of Sabah especially in infrastructure, energy, information and communications technology, water treatment and waste since it has expertise in these areas as well in education.

High Commission of Malaysia, Ottawa 

The High Commission of Malaysia in Ottawa is Malaysia's primary diplomatic mission in Canada. It is located at 60 Boteler Street in Ottawa. The first High Commissioner of Malaysia to Canada was Tan Sri Ong Yoke Lin, who was appointed in April 1967.

The current High Commissioner of Malaysia to Canada is Her Excellency Dato' Nor' Aini Abd Hamid, since September 2019, who replaced Her Excellency Dato' Aminahtun (from 2016 to 2018), and prior to her, Her Excellency Dato' Hayati Ismail (2011-2015).

High Commission of Canada, Kuala Lumpur 

The  High Commission of Canada in Malaysia is found in Kuala Lumpur. The High Commissioner since November 2017 is Julia G. Bentley. There is also a consulate headed by an honorary consul in Penang.

Further reading 
 Canada's relations with Malaysia JSTOR

References

External links 
 High Commission of Malaysia in Ottawa
 Consulate General of Malaysia in Vancouver

 
Malaysia
Bilateral relations of Malaysia
Malaysia
Canada